is a Japanese male  track cyclist, and part of the national team. He competed in the 2007 and 2009 UCI Track Cycling World Championships. He is also a professional keirin cyclist.

References

External links
 Profile at cyclingarchives.com

1979 births
Living people
Japanese male cyclists
Place of birth missing (living people)
Cyclists at the 2006 Asian Games
Cyclists at the 2010 Asian Games
Asian Games medalists in cycling
Asian Games gold medalists for Japan
Asian Games silver medalists for Japan
Medalists at the 2006 Asian Games
Medalists at the 2010 Asian Games
Keirin cyclists